The 1972 Championship of Australia was the 16th edition of the Championship of Australia, an ANFC-organised national club Australian rules football tournament between the champion clubs from the VFL, the SANFL, the WANFL and the Tasmanian State Premiership.

Qualified Teams

Venue
 Adelaide Oval (Capacity: 64,000)

Fixtures

Semi-finals

Third-place play-off

Championship of Australia final 
 

Championship of Australia
Champions of Australia
October 1972 sports events in Australia